ALOC may refer to::
Air line of communication
Altered level of consciousness
Actual lines of code

See also 
 Alok
 Alloc
 Allock, Kentucky